The 2017 Baku FIA Formula 2 round was a pair of motor races held on 23 and 25 June 2017 at the Baku City Circuit in Baku, Azerbaijan as part of the FIA Formula 2 Championship. It was the fourth round of the 2017 FIA Formula 2 Championship and was run in support of the 2017 Azerbaijan Grand Prix.

Classifications

Qualifying

Feature Race 
The race was scheduled for 29 laps; however, an incident in lap 26 brought out the red flag and the race was stopped. The result was counted back at the end of lap 24.

Ralph Boschung did not make any pit stop but kept his 8th place since the race was stopped by red flag rather than finished.

Sprint Race

Championship standings after the round

Drivers' Championship standings

Teams' Championship standings

 Note: Only the top five positions are included for both sets of standings.

References

External links 
 

Baku
Formula 2
Formula 2